New Zealand started metrication in 1969 with the establishment of the Metric Advisory Board (MAB) and completed metrication on 14 December 1976. Until the 1970s, New Zealand traditionally used the imperial system for measurement, which it had inherited from the United Kingdom.

Strategy toward metrication
The New Zealand metric symbol was introduced in March 1971. To give metrication a human face, a baby girl whose parents agreed to co-operate was nicknamed Miss Metric. News and pictures of her progress were intermingled with press releases about the progress of metrication.  By the end of 1972 the temperature scale, road signs, and measures used in the sale of such items as wool and milk had been metricated. Only a few letters voiced outright opposition to the changeover.

Exceptions
Although New Zealand completed metrication in the 1970s, a 1992 study of university students found that at that time there was a continued use of imperial units for birth weight and human height alongside metric units. On the 30th anniversary of the introduction of the metric system in December 2006, the New Zealand Consumer Affairs Minister, Judith Tizard, commented that "Now 30 years on the metric system is part of our daily lives" but noted some continuing use of imperial measurements in some birth announcements of baby weights and also with people's heights.

A few uses of imperial measurements remain, mostly to do with interoperability:
 The aviation industry is one of the last major users of the imperial system: altitude and airport elevation are measured in feet. All other aspects (fuel quantity, aircraft weight, runway length, etc.) use metric.
 Where exact fitting of parts is required, such as between nuts and bolts, or between tyres and wheel rims.
 Since the late 1990's, display sizes for screens on televisions, computer monitors, tablets and mobile phones have reverted to having their diagonals advertised solely in inches; the legality of such advertising has not been tested in court.

References

External links
 Weights and Measures Act 1987
 Metrication in New Zealand

New Zealand
Science and technology in New Zealand